Enrique Javier Loya (born February 2, 1969) is a Mexican-American business entrepreneur and former college football player. He is a minority owner of the NFL's Houston Texans. Loya is also the co-founder of independent commodity broker OTC Global Holdings.

Education and family 
Loya was raised in El Paso, Texas as the second-youngest of seven children. His father worked at a Farah Manufacturing Co. plant and taught his children to prioritize education. Loya graduated from New York City's Columbia University with a Bachelor of Arts in political science in 1991. Loya married Lucinda Vincent (Now Lucinda Vincent-Loya) and has 2 children.

Football career
Loya played for the Columbia Lions as a linebacker and a defensive end throughout his academic career at Columbia University. He was a varsity letterman in all three of his varsity seasons and was named an Honorable Mention All-Ivy League Selection in 1990. He is tied with several other players for the fourth-most career fumble recoveries while playing for the Columbia Lions.

Career

Choice! Energy LP
In 1994, Loya co-founded Choice! Energy LP with two partners. Choice was an energy brokerage firm specializing in natural gas.

In 2000, Loya purchased control of the company from his partners.

After Texas deregulated the power market in 2002, Loya launched a new firm, Choice Energy Services. As the sole owner of Choice Energy Services, Loya expanded the company's services from wholesale markets to retail commodities management.

In 2015, Loya's company, Choice Energy, filed a lawsuit against 9 of their brokers for breach of contract. The 9 brokers filed a countersuit claiming they were forced to resign due to unpaid commissions and hostile work environment. All but one broker settled out of court.

Houston Texans
In 2002, Loya became the first Hispanic owner in the NFL after he purchased a minority stake in the Houston Texans. Loya was one of 10 investors in the Houston Texans.

During the Choice Energy lawsuit, Javier was accused of being a high-stakes gambler, which sparked an investigation from the NFL due to Javier's ownership of the Houston Texans. According to the NFL Ownership Guidelines, it is a violation for owners or employees of any NFL team to take part in any gambling.

OTC Global Holdings
In 2007, Loya co-founded OTC Global Holdings as a commodity brokerage that initially acquired Choice Natural Gas, Choice Power, and Choice Energy. OTC Global Holdings has grown to serve over 450 institutional clients in the Americas, Europe, and Asia.

Litigation
In late December 2019, John Klosek, one of the founding members of OTC Global Holdings, filed a lawsuit against the CEO Javier Loya, COO Joseph Kelly, and several employees. The lawsuit was over extravagant personal spending decreasing the company's value to a negative net worth. Loya and the other accusees denied the allegations. The claims state the defendants have embezzled over millions of dollars from OTC Global Holdings for personal use. The lawsuit was dismissed in May 2021.

Veneno Tequila 
In September 2019, Loya, his wife Lucinda, and several Houston entrepreneurs launched a tequila brand called Veneno Tequila. Actor Danny Trejo was the first person to introduce and drink a bottle of Veneno Tequila.

Other activities 
Loya has served on the Board of Regents for Texas Southern University as well as other charitable foundations across Houston.

Philanthropy
Loya is a sponsor and member of the board of directors for the Greater Houston Senior Football Showcase, a charitable organization that organizes high school football scouting events. The organization has provided over $100 million in scholastic aid to over 3,000 participants since 2008.

In 2011, Loya founded the Greater El Paso Football Showcase Combine, which provided over $9 million in scholarships to over 100 high school senior athletes.

Awards
In 2002, Loya received the “Entrepreneur of the Year” Award from the Houston Hispanic Chamber of Commerce.
In 2004, Loya was named “Hispanic Businessman of the Year” by the United States Hispanic Chamber of Commerce. 
In 2004, Javier was also given the John Jay Award for distinguished professional achievement by his former university, Columbia University. 
In 2007, Javier received the “Emerging Leader” Award from the Greater Houston Partnership. 
In 2010, Javier received the “Entrepreneur of the Year” Award from Ernst & Young.
In 2017, Loya was honored as a distinguished graduate by the Ivy Football Association at its bi-annual dinner at the Sheraton New York Times Square Hotel.

References

External links 
 OTC Global Holdings

Living people
Businesspeople from Texas
American financial company founders
People from Houston
Columbia Lions football players
1969 births
Houston Texans owners
American people of Mexican descent